Keen.com is a website that connects people with psychics. Launched in 1999, it works as a live answer community for people to get answers to their questions over the phone and online. It is a brand of the knowledge commerce platform Ingenio.

History
 
Keen.com was originally a help website that allowed people to get answers to questions by telephone. Launched in 1999, it received early stage funding, including $60 million in 2000 from a team of investors including Benchmark Capital, eBay, and Microsoft. By the end of its first year, it had received a total of $109 million and was the fastest growing company in the e-commerce sector.
 
The site eventually merged with LiveAdvice and Inforocket and changed its company name to Ingenio. Keen.com became a brand of Ingenio and rebranded to offering psychic advice.

Platform
 
Keen.com is a marketplace that connects people to psychics through its website and mobile app. The site makes the connection between both parties so the identity of the advice seeker remains anonymous. The site connects people for psychic readings as well as tarot readings, astrological, and love and relationship advice.

References

External links
 Keen.com
 Ingenio

Internet properties established in 1999